Herbert Bernard Callen (July 1, 1919 – May 22, 1993) was an American physicist specializing in thermodynamics and statistical mechanics. He is considered one of the founders of the modern theory of irreversible thermodynamics, and is the author of the classic textbook Thermodynamics and an Introduction to Thermostatistics, published in two editions. During World War II, his services were invoked in the theoretical division of the Manhattan Project.

Life and work
A native of Philadelphia, Herbert Callen received his Bachelor of Science degree from Temple University. His graduate studies were interrupted by the Manhattan Project. He also worked on a U.S. Navy project concerning guided missiles (Project Bumblebee) at Princeton University in 1945. Callen subsequently completed his PhD in physics at the Massachusetts Institute of Technology (MIT) in 1947. He was supervised by the physicist László Tisza. His doctoral dissertation concerns the Kelvin thermoelectric and thermomagnetic relations, and Onsager's reciprocal relations; it was titled On the Theory of Irreversible Processes. Upon receiving his degree, Callen spent a year at the MIT Laboratory for Insulation Research and developed his theory of electrical breakdown for insulators.

In 1948, Callen joined the faculty of the Department of Physics at the University of Pennsylvania and became a professor in 1956. Specialists consider his most lasting contribution to physics to be the paper co-written with Theodore A. Welton presenting a proof of the fluctuation-dissipation theorem, an extremely general result describing how a system's response to perturbations relates to its behavior at equilibrium. This crucial result became the basis for the statistical theory of irreversible processes and explains how fluctuations dissipate energy into heat in general and the phenomenon of Nyquist noise in particular. Callen then pioneered the thermodynamic Green's functions for magnetism. With his students, he studied many-body problems involving spin operators. This led to the discovery of some useful methods of approximations.

The first edition of his classic text Thermodynamics and an Introduction to Thermostatistics was published in 1960. In it, he presents a rigorous axiomatic treatment of thermodynamics in which the state functions are the fundamental entities and the processes are their differentials. The postulates concern the existence of thermal equilibrium, and the properties of entropy. From them, he derives the fundamentals of thermodynamics, found in the first eight chapters. The much revised second edition, published in 1985, became a highly cited reference in the literature and an enduring textbook.

He was a successful teacher, noted for his ability to explain complicated phenomena in simple terms. He played a key role in the recruitment of promising solid-state physicists to the University of Pennsylvania in the late 1950s and continued to be active in the University's academic affairs till his retirement in 1985.

He was the recipient of a Guggenheim Fellowship for the academic year 1972-1973. In 1984, Callen received the Elliott Cresson Medal from the Franklin Institute. He retired in 1985. He was made a member of the National Academy of Sciences in 1990.

After battling Alzheimer's disease for eleven years, Herbert Callen died in the Philadelphia suburb of Merion in 1993. He was 73 years old. He was survived by his wife, Sara Smith, and their two children, Jed and Jill.

See also 

List of textbooks in thermodynamics and statistical mechanics
 Richard Chase Tolman
 Constantin Carathéodory, who also sought an axiomatic formulation of thermodynamics

References

External links
Callen, Herbert B, and Theodore A Welton. “Irreversibility and Generalized Noise.” Physical Review, vol. 83, no. 1, 1951, pp. 34–40.

1919 births
1993 deaths
20th-century American physicists
20th-century American writers
MIT Department of Physics alumni
Scientists from Philadelphia
Temple University alumni
Thermodynamicists
University of Pennsylvania faculty
Manhattan Project people
Members of the United States National Academy of Sciences
Deaths from dementia in Pennsylvania
Deaths from Alzheimer's disease